Live at the Enmore Theatre (1999) is a live EP by The Tea Party and is the band's first live release. The EP was released through Australian radio station Triple J in a limited quantity of 100. Recorded live at the Enmore Theatre, Sydney on 7 October 1999, during the band's tour for Triptych, the EP features performances of songs from the album. A string quintet performs with the band on "The Messenger".

At least one of these songs had to be especially played twice as there was a recording problem that TripleJ made. Jeff Martin informed the audience and asked if they minded if he played the song again.

Track listing 
 "Heaven Coming Down"
 "Underground"
 "Gone"
  "The Messenger" (Daniel Lanois cover)
 "Halcyon Days"

Personnel 
The Tea Party:
Jeff Burrows - drums and percussion
Stuart Chatwood - Bass guitar, bass pedals, keyboards
Jeff Martin - vocals, acoustic and electric guitars, oud
String quintet:
Rob John - Violin
Adrian Bendt - Violin
Jane Brownlee - Viola
Heather Shaw - Cello
Rachel Wheally - Cello
The Sound on Stage Mobile Audio:
David Cafe - Engineer
Phil Gange - Assistant Engineer
Penny Connolly-Coates - Assistant Engineer
Steve Kennedy - Assistant Engineer
Metropolis Audio, South Melbourne:
Jeff Martin - Mixer
Timmy Johnson - Assistant Mixer

1999 EPs
The Tea Party albums
1999 live albums
Live EPs